HD 138573 is a G-type main-sequence star in the constellation Serpens, class G5IV-V, roughly 100.8 light-years from Earth (30.912 parsecs). 
Though a G-type star like the Sun, a 2005 study found that it is not a solar twin as HD 138573 has a much lower mass, lower metallicity, and is much older age than the Sun at 5.6 billion years old. HD 138573 is otherwise close to the Sun's characteristics and could be classed as a Solar analog.

Mahdi et al. (2016) named the star the best solar twin candidate out of their dataset of around 2,800 candidates.

See also 
 HD 192699
 HD 210702

Sun comparison
Chart compares the Sun to HD 138573.

References

Durchmusterung objects
138573
1989
Serpens (constellation)
G-type main-sequence stars